HMS Indefatigable was one of the  64-gun third-rate ships-of-the-line designed by Sir Thomas Slade in 1761 for the Royal Navy. She was built as a ship-of-the-line, but most of her active service took place after her conversion to a 44-gun razee frigate. She had a long career under several distinguished commanders, serving throughout the French Revolutionary Wars and the Napoleonic Wars. She took some 27 prizes, alone or in company, and the Admiralty authorised the issue of four clasps to the Naval General Service Medal in 1847 to any surviving members of her crews from the respective actions. She was broken up in 1816.

Construction
Indefatigable was ordered on 3 August 1780 (long after Slade's death), and her keel was laid down in May 1781 at the Bucklers Hard shipyard in Hampshire owned by Henry Adams. She was launched in early July 1784 and completed from 11 July to 13 September of that year at Portsmouth Dockyard as a 64-gun two-decked third rate for the Royal Navy. She had cost £25,210 4s 5d to build; her total initial cost including fitting out and coppering was £36,154 18s 7d. By that time, she was already anachronistic for the role of a ship of the line as the French only built the more powerful 74-gun ships, and was never commissioned in that role.

Design modification
In 1794, she was razéed; her upper gun deck was cut away to convert her into a large and heavily armed frigate. The original intention was to retain her twenty-six 24-pounder guns on her gundeck, and to mount eight 12-pounder guns on her quarterdeck and a further four on her forecastle, which would have rated her as a 38-gun vessel. However, it was at this time that the carronade was becoming more popular in the Navy, and her intended armament was altered on 5 December 1794 with the addition of four 42-pounder carronades to go on her quarterdeck and two on her forecastle. The work was carried out at Portsmouth from September 1794 to February 1795 at a cost of £8,764. On 17 February 1795, a further two 12-pounder guns were added to her quarterdeck, though her official rating remained unchanged.

French Revolutionary Wars

Captain Sir Edward Pellew
Indefatigable was first commissioned in December 1794 under Captain Sir Edward Pellew. He commanded her until early 1799.

On 9 March 1795, Indefatigable, and  captured numerous French prizes: Temeraire, Minerve, Gentille, Regeneration, and a brig and sloop of unknown names. In October, the Dutch East Indiaman Zeelilee was wrecked in the Isles of Scilly with the loss of 25 of her 70 crew. Indefatigable rescued the survivors.

On 20 March 1796, Indefatigable and her squadron chased three French corvettes, of which the Volage of 26 guns ran ashore under a battery at the mouth of the Loire. Volage lost her masts in running ashore, but the French were later able to refloat her. Her two consorts  and Eclatant escaped into the river. In this action,  had four men wounded.

Between 11 and 21 March Indefatigables squadron captured the vessels Favorite Sultana, Friends, Providence, Four Marys, Aimable Justine, and Nouvelle Union. They also destroyed two unnamed brigs and a chasse maree. The vessels sharing in the prize money were: Indefatigable, Concorde, Amazon, and the hired armed cutter Dolly and hired armed lugger Duke of York.

On 13 April 1796, Indefatigable was in pursuit of a French frigate. Pellew signalled to Révolutionnaire to cut her off from the shore. Révolutionnaire then captured the French frigate Unité after having fired two broadsides into her. Unité had nine men killed and 11 wounded; Révolutionnaire had no casualties. The Royal Navy took the frigate into service as HMS Unite.

After an hour and three quarters of fighting, she still had not struck and had somewhat outmaneuvered Indefatigable when Concorde arrived. Seeing that she was outnumbered, Virginie struck.

Virginie carried 44 guns, 18 and 9-pounders, and had a crew of 340 men under the command of Citizen Bergeret, Capitaine de Vaisseau. She had 14 or 15 men killed, 17 badly wounded, and 10 slightly. She also had four feet of water in her hold from shot holes. Indefatigable had no casualties. Pellew sent Virginie into Plymouth under the escort of Concorde, and followed the next day with Amazon, which had sustained some damage.

In July 1796, there was an initial distribution of £20,000 of prize money for the capture of Unite and Virginie. Indefatigable shared this with Amazon, Révolutionnaire, Concorde, and Argo. Apparently, Duke of York also shared in some or all of the prize money. In 1847, the Admiralty authorised the issue of the Naval General Service Medal with clasp "Indefatigable 20 Apl. 1796".

On 12 June, Indefatigable, Amazon, Concorde, Revolutionaire, and  took two French brigs off Ushant – the Trois Couleurs and the Blonde (alias Betsey) – after a chase of 24 hours. Trois Couleurs carried 10 guns and a crew of 70. Blonde had 16 guns and a crew of 95 men. Each was under the command of an ensign de vaisseau and both vessels had left Brest two days earlier for a six-week cruise, but had not yet taken any prizes.

In September 1796, Indefatigable, Phoebe, Révolutionnaire, and Amazon captured five Spanish ships.

On 1 October, Indefatigable, Amazon, Révolutionnaire, Phoebe, and Jason shared in the capture of the Vrow Delenea Maria. The next day, Pellew and Indefatigable captured the privateer schooner Ariel of Boston off Corunna. Earlier, Pellew had recaptured the brig Queen of Naples, which had been sailing from Lisbon to Cork. From her, he learned that there were two privateers around Corunna, one of which had captured a brig from Lisbon with a cargo of bale goods two days earlier. Pellew immediately set off towards Corunna and was able to intercept the Ariel. She had 12 guns and a crew of 75 men. She was 14 days out of Bordeaux. Her consort, the schooner Vengeur, was of the same strength, and Pellew yet hoped to catch her, too. The brig from Bristol, however, had made it into the port of Ferrol, where Pellew had earlier chased two French frigates.

In January 1797, Indefatigable and Amazon captured the packet Sangossee. On 7 January, Indefatigable and Amazon captured the Emanuel. Later that month, Indefatigable fought her most famous battle.

The Action of 13 January 1797 was an engagement off the Penmarks involving the two frigates Indefatigable and Amazon against the French , a 74-gun ship of the line. The battle ended with Droits de l'Homme being driven onto shore in a gale. Amazon also ran onto the shore; still, almost her entire crew survived both the battle and the grounding and were captured. Despite being embayed and having damaged masts and rigging, Indefatigable was able to repair the damage and beat off the lee shore, showing excellent seamanship. She had only 19 officers and men wounded, with most of those not being serious. This action resulted the award of the Naval General Service Medal with clasp "Indefatigable 13 Jany. 1797" for any crew surviving in 1847.

On 18 January Indefatigable was at Falmouth. There she saved all on board when a fire destroyed the American merchantman .

Subsequently, Indefatigable or Pellew's squadron took more vessels, including privateers, primarily in the Channel. Thus, Pellew reported that, on 30 April 1797, "we" captured the French brigantine privateer Basque. She was armed with eight guns and carried a crew of 50 men.

On 11 May, Indefatigable in company with Phoebe, and Duke of York captured Nouvelle Eugénie. She was a razee privateer of 16 guns and carried a crew of 120 men. She was four days out of Nantes on a 30-day cruise, but had taken no prizes.

On 21 July, the Duke of York returned, having chased a French privateer lugger into the hands of Lieutenant Bray, who commanded the Revenue Cutter Hind. Hind also recaptured a sloop that the privateer had captured. The lugger was armed with two guns and carried a crew of 25 men.

On 14 October, Indefatigable arrived at Teneriffe. There at midnight she captured the French brig corvette . Ranger was armed with 14 guns and carried a crew of 70 men. She had been carrying dispatches to the West Indies, which she was able to destroy before capture. The next day, Pellew captured a Spanish schooner carrying a cargo of fish. Indefatigable was short of water, so he put the crew of Ranger on board the schooner (though not Rangers officers) and sent them ashore at Santa Cruz.

Ten days after that, Indefatigable captured the privateer Hyène after a chase of eight hours. She was armed with twenty-four 9-pounder guns and had a crew of 230 men. She was two weeks out of Bayonne but had not captured anything. Hyène had apparently mistaken Indefatigable for a vessel from Portuguese India. Pellew estimated that, had she not lost her foretopmast in the chase, she might have escaped. She had been the post-ship  until her capture in 1793; the Royal Navy took her back into service under her original name.

Indefatigable returned to the Channel. Vengeur was a new vessel of 12 guns and 72 men. She was eight days out of Ostend but had taken no prizes. Pellew sent her into Falmouth.

Five days later, in the evening of the 16th, Pellew's squadron captured the French privateer Inconcevable. She was armed with eight guns and had a crew of 55 men. She was 10 days out of Dunkirk and had taken nothing.

On 28 January, Indefatigable and Cambrian captured the privateer Heureuse Nouvelle. She was armed with 22 guns and had a crew of 130 men. She was 36 days out of Brest and, during that time, had captured only one ship, a large American vessel named the Providence which had a cargo of cotton and sugar. Pellew sent Cambrian in pursuit. Duke of York also shared in the capture.

On 30 April 1798, Indefatigable captured the brigantine privateer Basque. She was armed with eight guns and had a crew of 50 men. Indefatigable and Cleopatra captured the Hope on 11 July.

At daylight on 4 August, Indefatigable sighted the privateer Heureux together with a prize and gave chase. The two separated, with the prize heading directly for Bayonne. After a chase of 32 hours on a great circular route, Indefatigable and her quarry found themselves off Bayonne where Indefatigable intercepted the prize and captured her. The privateer was the Heureux, of 16 guns and 112 men. Her prize was the Canada, John Sewell Master, which had been sailing from Jamaica to London, having stopped in Charlestown, with a cargo of sugar, rum, and coffee. Pellew exchanged prisoners, taking off the crew of the Canada and putting on her the crew of Heureux. He then drove Canada on shore where he hoped that her cargo at least would be destroyed.

Indefatigable captured the French corvette Vaillante while cruising in the Bay of Biscay on 8 August, after a chase of 24 hours, which was under the command of Lieutenant de Vaisseau La Porte. The corvette fired a few shots before she struck. She was armed with twenty-two 9-pounder guns and had a crew of 175 men. She had left Rochefort on 1 August, and the Île de Ré on the 4th, where she had picked up 25 banished priests, 27 convicts, and a Madame Rovere and family, all of whom she was taking to Cayenne. She was only 18 months old, coppered, and a fast sailer. On 15 November 1798, Indefatigable captured Mercurius.

At dawn on 31 December 1798, Indefatigable captured the Minerve, five leagues off Ushant. She was armed with 16 guns and carried a crew of 140 men. She was four weeks out of Saint-Malo and was waiting to enter Brest when captured. She had taken several prizes, one of which, the Asphalon, Indefatigable captured on 1 January 1799. Aspahalon, a Newcastle vessel, had been sailing from Halifax to London with a cargo of sugar, coffee, and tobacco. Other vessels which Minerve had captured included Martinus (Bremen brig), Tagus (Portuguese brig ), Minerva (English snow), and Ann and Dorothea (aka Beata Maria, Danish schooner).

On 14 January 1799, Indefatigable recaptured Argo, Rich, master, which had been sailing from Gothenburg for Boston when a French privateer had captured her. After her recapture Argo arrived at Falmouth.

More captures or recaptures of merchantmen followed. Indefatigable, and  recaptured the Providence on 10 January 1799, the Pomona on 5 February, and the Wohlfarden on 9 February.

Subsequent commanders
From March 1799 until the end of 1800 Indefatigable was under the command of Captain Henry Curzon. On 31 May she captured the brig Vénus. Venus was armed with twelve 4-pounder guns and two 9-pounders, and carried a crew of 101 men. She was nine weeks out of Rochefort and had captured two prizes, the schooner Clarence, sailing from Lisbon to London, and a ship from Lisbon sailing to Hamburg with a cargo of salt. Indefatigable was apparently also in company with Fisgard and Diamond.

On 9 October 1799 Indefatigable, Diamond, Cambrian, Nymphe and  shared in the capture of the Spanish brig Nostra Senora de la Solidad. Then on 7 November Nymphe, Indefatigable and Diamond shared in the recapture of the ship Brailsford.

On 11 February Indefatigable captured the Vidette.

On 12 June 1800, Indefatigable captured the French privateer brig Vengeur. She was armed with six long 4-pounders and ten 18-pounder carronades, and carried a crew of 102 men. She was two days out of Bordeaux and sailing for the coast of Brazil. Vengeur was sailing in company with three letters of marque – a ship, a brig and a schooner – that were bound for Guadeloupe. On 11 June Vengeur had captured the Jersey-privateer lugger Snake. Indefatigable shared the prize money with Sirius.

On 3 July Indefatigable recaptured the brig Cultivator, from the French. Eleven days later, Indefatigable and Sirius captured the French ship Favori. The next day Bordelais (or Bourdelois) captured the Phoenix. Indefatigable, Sirius and  shared with Bordelais by agreement, and  further shared with Bordelais.

Indefatigable then was with Sir John Borlase Warren's squadron at Ferrol. She apparently did not participate in the attack on a fort at the bay of Playa de Dominos (Doniños) on 25 August 1800.

Indefatigable had been chasing Venus from the morning when in the afternoon Fisgard came in sight and forced Venus to turn. Both British vessels arrived at Venus at almost the same time (7pm). Venus was armed with 32-guns and had a crew of 200 men. She was sailing from Rochefort to Senegal. Indefatigable and Fisgard shared the prize money with Boadicea, Diamond, and the hired armed schooner .

In January 1801 Indefatigable was under Captain Matthew Scott. Indefatigable was part of the squadron that shared by agreement in the prize money from the Temeraire, which  had captured on 30 May. Similarly, the same vessels shared by agreement in Dashers capture of Bien Aimé on 23 July 1801. Indefatigable was then paid off later that year. Indefatigable was laid up in ordinary at Plymouth in March to April 1802, as a result of the peace of October 1801.

Napoleonic Wars
Following the resumption of hostilities, Indefatigable was fitted out for sea between July and September 1803. She was recommissioned under Captain Graham Moore, younger brother of Sir John Moore of Rifle Brigade and Corunna fame.

Action of 5 October 1804

They were carrying bullion from Montevideo, South America to Spain. Spain was a neutral country at the time, but was showing strong signs of declaring war in alliance with Napoleonic France. Acting on Admiralty orders, Moore required the Spaniards to change their course and sail for England. Admiral Bustamente refused and a short engagement ensued.

First Mercedes blew up. Then Indefatigable captured Medée, and Lively captured Clara. After a further chase, Lively and Medusa captured Fama.
 Medée the flagship was armed with forty-two 18-pounder guns on her main deck and had a crew of 300 men. She lost two men killed and 10 wounded.
 Fama, the Commodore's ship, was armed with thirty-six 12-pounder guns on her main deck and had a crew of 180 men. She lost 11 killed and 50 wounded.
 Clara was armed with thirty-six 12-pounder guns on her main deck and had a crew of 300 men. She lost seven killed and 20 wounded.
 Mercedes was armed with thirty-six 12-pounder guns on her main deck and had a crew of 280 men. After she exploded, the British were only able to rescue her second captain and 40 men.

Indefatigable had no casualties. Amphion had five men wounded, one badly. Lively had two killed and four wounded. Indefatigable and Amphion escorted Medée and Fama to Plymouth. Medusa and Lively brought in Clara.

The value of the treasure was very large and, if it had been treated as Prize of War, then Moore and his fellow captains would have become extremely wealthy. As it was, the money and ships were declared to be "Droits of Admiralty" on the grounds that war had not been declared. Hence the captains and crew shared a relatively small ex gratia payment of £160,000 for the bullion, plus the proceeds of the sale of the hull and cargo.

Normal operations
In October 1805 Indefatigable, now under Captain John Tremayne Rodd (−1809), was part of the blockade of Brest. One boat each from the ships of the line of the squadron, plus three boats each from Indefatigable and  entered the Gironde on 15 July 1806 to attack two French corvettes and a convoy. A change in the wind permitted all but one corvette to escape. The British captured the French corvette  (or Caesar), which the Royal Navy took into service as HMS Cesar. She was armed with 18 guns, had a crew of 86 men, and was under the command of Monsieur Louis Francois Hector Fourré, lieutenant de vaisseau. The French were expecting the attack and put up a strong resistance. The British lost six men killed, 36 wounded and 21 missing. Indefatigable alone lost two killed and 11 wounded. Most of the boats in the attack were so shot through that the British later abandoned them. The vessels claiming prize money included  and the hired armed lugger , in addition to the various ships of the line and frigates. This cutting out expedition resulted in the participants qualifying for the Naval General Service Medal with clasp "16 July Boat Service 1806".

About a year later, on 19 October 1806, Indefatigable, and  captured the chasse marees Achille, Jenny, and Marianne. On 5 December 1807 Indefatigable captured the Pamelia. Then on the day after Christmas, Indefatigable and  captured the American ship Eliza.

On 7 January 1808 Indefatigable and  Tribune captured the French galiot Fanny and her cargo.

Then on 31 July, Indefatigable, in company with the gun-brig , captured the letter of marque Diane, which was on her way to Île de France, carrying naval stores, as well as letters and dispatches that she threw overboard during the chase. She was six years old, had a burthen of 482 tons (bm), was armed with fourteen 9 and 6-pounder guns, and had a crew of 68 men. She had left the Gironde the evening before on this, her second voyage, to India.

On 19 August Indefatigable, still in company with Conflict, captured Adele. In December a distribution of £10,000 was payable for the proceeds from Diane and Adele. On 1 November Indefatigable captured Bonne Louise.

On 14 January 1809 Indefatigable captured French privateer lugger Clarisse in the Channel. She was pierced for 14 guns but had only three mounted. She had left Saint-Malo the evening before and had not made any captures. At the time of the capture, Amazon, Iris, and Goldfinch were in sight. They shared with Indefatigable in the proceeds for the hull, but not the bounty money for the captured crew. On 20 February  captured the French schooner Matilda. Indefatigable was in company.

Indefatigable arrived at the Basque Roads on 25 February. While there she captured two vessels, the Danish ship Neptunus on 24 March and the French ship Nymphe on 28 March. Foxhound was also in company for the capture of Nymphe.

In April 1809 Indefatigable participated in the battle of the Basque Roads. The action earned her crew another clasp to the Naval General Service Medal: "Basque Roads 1809".

In October 1809 Indefatigable was under Captain Henry E. R. Baker. Captain John Broughton succeeded him in December 1809 and remained in command until 1812.

On 11 January 1810, Indefatigable captured Mouche № 26 near Cap de Peñas. Under the command of Enseigne de vausseau provisorie Fleury, she had sailed from Pasajes with despatches for Île de France. The next day Mouche № 26 foundered near the Penmarks. Fleury, presumably among others, was drowned.

Next, Indefatigable recaptured  Flora on 13 June. On 20 October Indefatigable re-captured the Portuguese brig Intrigua.

On 15 January 1811,  captured Matilda and her cargo.

Then in June 1812, under Captain John Fyffe, Indefatigable was on the South American station, where she visited the Galápagos Islands. During this cruise she gave the second largest island, now known as Santa Cruz island, its English name – Indefatigable.

By July Indefatigable was back in Portsmouth. When news of the outbreak of the War of 1812 reached Britain, the Royal Navy seized all American vessels then in British ports. Indefatigable was among the Royal Navy vessels then lying at Spithead or Portsmouth and so entitled to share in the grant for the American ships Belleville, Janus, Aeos, Ganges, and Leonidas seized there on 31 July 1812.

On 17 September Indefatigable, and Cretan shared in the capture of Dankbarheide. When the gun-brig Hearty detained the Prussian vessel Friede on 29 September, Indefatigable, Desiree, Primrose, Cretan, Drake, were either in company or sharing by agreement.

Indefatigable was reported to have been at Lima on 11 July 1815, about to sail for the Galápagos Islands.

Fate
Indefatigable was finally paid off in 1815. She was broken up at Sheerness in August 1816.

Prizes

Notes, citations, and references

Notes

Citations

References

 
 Fonds Marine. Campagnes (opérations ; divisions et stations navales ; missions diverses). Inventaire de la sous-série Marine BB4. Tome premier : BB4 210 à 482 (1805–1826)
 Gardiner, Robert (2006) Frigates of the Napoleonic Wars. Chatham Publishing, London. .
 Lavery, Brian (2003) The Ship of the Line – Volume 1: The development of the battlefleet 1650–1850. Conway Maritime Press. .

External links 
 

Ships of the line of the Royal Navy
Ardent-class ships of the line
Frigates of the Royal Navy
1784 ships
Ships built on the Beaulieu River